Ramón Ortiz is a Major League Baseball pitcher.

Ramon Ortiz may also refer to:

 Ramon Ortiz (musician), guitar player for the band Puya
 Ramón Ortiz y Miera, priest, founder of Basilica of San Albino

See also
Juan Ramon Ortiz